Eugen Weidmann (5 February 1908 – 17 June 1939) was a German criminal and serial killer who was executed by guillotine in France in June 1939, the last public execution in France.

Early life
Weidmann was born in Frankfurt am Main to the family of an export businessman, and went to school there. He was sent to live with his grandparents at the outbreak of World War I; during this time he started stealing. Later in his twenties he served five years in Saarbrücken jail for robbery.

During his time in jail Weidmann met two men who would later become his partners in crime: Roger Million and Jean Blanc. After their release from jail, they decided to work together to kidnap rich tourists visiting France and steal their money. They rented a villa in Saint-Cloud, near Paris, for this purpose.

Murders
Their first kidnapping attempt ended in failure because their victim struggled too hard, forcing them to let him go. In July 1937, they made a second attempt, Weidmann having made the acquaintance of Jean De Koven, a 22-year-old New York City dancer visiting her aunt Ida Sackheim in Paris. Impressed by the tall, handsome German, De Koven wrote to a friend: "I have just met a charming German of keen intelligence who calls himself Siegfried. Perhaps I am going to another Wagnerian role – who knows? I am going to visit him tomorrow at his villa in a beautiful place near a famous mansion that Napoleon gave Josephine." During their meeting they smoked, and "Siegfried" gave her a glass of milk. De Koven took photos of Weidmann with her new camera (later found beside her body; the developed film showing her killer). Weidmann then strangled and buried her in the villa's garden. She had 300 francs in cash and $430 in traveler's cheques, which the group sent Million's mistress, Colette Tricot, to cash. Sackheim received a letter demanding $500 for the return of her niece. De Koven's brother Henry later came to France offering a 10,000-franc reward from his father, Abraham, for information about the young woman.

On 1 September that year, Weidmann hired a chauffeur named Joseph Couffy to drive him to the French Riviera where, in a forest outside Tours, he shot Couffy in the back of his neck and stole his car and 2,500 francs. The next murder came on 3 September, after Weidmann and Million lured Janine Keller, a private nurse, into a cave in the forest of Fontainebleau with a job offer. There he killed her, again with a bullet to the back of her neck, before robbing her of 1,400 francs and her diamond ring. On 16 October, Million and Weidmann arranged a meeting with a young theatrical producer named Roger LeBlond, promising to invest money in one of his shows. Instead, Weidmann shot him in the back of his head and took his wallet containing 5,000 francs. On 22 November, Weidmann murdered and robbed Fritz Frommer, a young German he had met in jail. Frommer, a Jew, had been held there for his anti-Nazi views. Once again, the victim was shot in the back of his neck. His body was buried in the basement of the Saint-Cloud house where De Koven was interred. Five days later, Weidmann committed his final murder. Raymond Lesobre, a real estate agent, was shot in the killer's preferred fashion while showing him around a house in Saint-Cloud. Five thousand francs were taken from him.

Arrest
Officers from the Sûreté, led by a young inspector named Primborgne, eventually tracked Weidmann to the villa from a business card left at Lesobre's office. Arriving at his home, Weidmann found two officers waiting for him. Inviting them in, he then turned and fired three times at them with a pistol. Although they were unarmed, the wounded Sûreté men managed to wrestle Weidmann down, knocking him unconscious with a hammer that happened to be nearby.
Weidmann was a highly co-operative prisoner, confessing to all his murders, including that of de Koven, the only one for which he expressed regret. He is reported to have said tearfully: "She was gentle and unsuspecting ... When I reached for her throat, she went down like a doll."

The murder trial of Weidmann, Million, Blanc and Tricot in Versailles in March 1939 was the biggest since that of Henri Désiré Landru, the modern-day "Bluebeard", 18 years earlier. One of Weidmann's lawyers, Vincent de Moro-Giafferi, had previously defended Landru. Also present was the French novelist Colette, who was engaged by Paris-Soir to write an essay on Weidmann.

Weidmann and Million received the death-sentence while Blanc received a jail sentence of twenty months and Tricot was acquitted. Million's sentence was later commuted to life imprisonment.

Execution
On 17 June 1939, Weidmann was beheaded outside the prison Saint-Pierre in Versailles. The "hysterical behavior" by spectators was so scandalous that French President Albert Lebrun immediately banned all future public executions. (Executions by guillotine continued out of public view until the last such execution, of Hamida Djandoubi on 10 September 1977.)

Christopher Lee, who was then seventeen years old, witnessed the event. Nearly half a century later, he portrayed headsman Charles-Henri Sanson in a 1989 French TV drama about the French Revolution, in which his character made prolific use of the device.

See also
 List of French serial killers

Books about Eugen Weidmann
 Beaux Ténèbres – La Pulsion du Mal d'Eugène Weidmann  by Michel Ferracci-Porri (Beautiful darkness, The Impulse to Evil of Eugen Weidmann) 412 pages, Editions Normant, France 2008
Comments On Cain by F. Tennyson Jesse (New York: Collier Books; London: Collier-Macmillan, Ltd., 1948, 1964), 158p., p. 99–158, "Eugen Weidmann: A Study in Brouhaha". There is a drawing of Weidmann as the frontispiece of the book.
 Weidmann appears repeatedly as a character in Jean Genet's celebrated debut work "Notre Dame des Fleurs" ("Our Lady of the Flowers"), first published in French by L'Arbalete, 1943.
Chapter "Death On A Quiet Boulevard" in Tom Fallon: "Craftsmen In Crime", published by Frederick Muller Ltd., London 1956.

References

External links

 Beaux Ténèbres – La Pulsion du Mal d'Eugène Weidmann 
 
Video of the execution

1908 births
1939 deaths
20th-century executions by France
Executed German serial killers
Executed people from Hesse
Filmed executions
German emigrants to France
German people executed abroad
People convicted of murder by France
People executed by France by guillotine
People executed by the French Third Republic
People from Frankfurt
Male serial killers